The Junior men's race at the 1990 IAAF World Cross Country Championships was held in Aix-les-Bains, France, at the Hippodrome de Marlioz on March 25, 1990. A report on the event was given in the Glasgow Herald.

Complete results, medallists, 
 and the results of British athletes were published.

Race results

Junior men's race (8 km)

Individual

Teams

Note: Athletes in parentheses did not score for the team result

Participation
An unofficial count yields the participation of 127 athletes from 30 countries in the Junior men's race.  This is in agreement with the official numbers as published.

 (6)
 (6)
 (2)
 (6)
 (5)
 (6)
 (1)
 (6)
 (6)
 (2)
 (6)
 (1)
 (6)
 (6)
 (6)
 (1)
 (1)
 (6)
 (5)
 (6)
 (1)
 (5)
 (6)
 (2)
 (1)
 (5)
 (1)
 (5)
 (6)
 (5)

See also
 1990 IAAF World Cross Country Championships – Senior men's race
 1990 IAAF World Cross Country Championships – Senior women's race
 1990 IAAF World Cross Country Championships – Junior women's race

References

Junior men's race at the World Athletics Cross Country Championships
IAAF World Cross Country Championships
1990 in youth sport